Richard Boone Cheatham (December 8, 1824 – May 7, 1877) was an American politician based in Nashville, Tennessee. He was serving as the mayor of Nashville, Tennessee during the opening years of the Civil War. After the war he served as alderman of the city, and later as a representative to the State House, 1869-1871.

Early life
Cheatham was born in Robertson County, Tennessee in 1824. He had two brothers, Edward Saunders Cheatham and Boyd M. Cheatham. Their father Richard Cheatham was a Whig politician and was elected in 1836 to the U.S. House of Representatives. Richard's two brothers, Edward Saunders Cheatham (1818-1878) and Boyd M. Cheatham, both served in the Tennessee state legislature.

Cheatham graduated from the University of Nashville.

Politics
Cheatham entered politics after college, serving as the clerk of the Tennessee House of Representatives.

At the age of 34, he was elected as an alderman in 1858, and as the Mayor of Nashville in 1860. He was removed from power by military governor Andrew Johnson when Union forces occupied the city beginning in 1862.

After the American Civil War, Cheatham was elected as an alderman of Nashville in 1865, and as the president of the board of aldermen in 1866.

Cheatham was elected during the Reconstruction era as a member of the Tennessee House of Representatives, serving from 1869 to 1871. His district included Davidson County as well as Robertson, Cheatham and Montgomery counties. He also served on the county court.

Personal life and death
Cheatham married Frances Ann Bugg. They lived at his family residence, the Mansfield Cheatham House in Springfield, Tennessee.

Cheatham died on May 7, 1877 in Nashville, Tennessee. His funeral was held at the First Presbyterian Church. He was buried at Mount Olivet Cemetery in Nashville.

One of his daughters, Katherine "Kitty" Cheatham (born in 1864), became a famous singer of children's songs and "plantation melodies" she remembered her African American "Mammy" singing during her childhood. His cousin was Major General Benjamin Franklin Cheatham.

References

Further reading
 

1824 births
1877 deaths
People from Springfield, Tennessee
University of Nashville alumni
Mayors of Nashville, Tennessee
Members of the Tennessee House of Representatives
19th-century American politicians
Cheatham family